Lacertaspis gemmiventris, also known as Sjostedt's five-toed skink, is a species of lizard in the family Scincidae. It is found in southwestern Cameroon and on the island of Bioko (Equatorial Guinea).

References

Lacertaspis
Skinks of Africa
Reptiles of Cameroon
Reptiles of Equatorial Guinea
Reptiles described in 1897
Taxa named by Bror Yngve Sjöstedt